Mewa Arena (stylised as MEWA ARENA; also known as the 1. FSV Mainz 05 Arena due to UEFA sponsorship regulations) is a multi-purpose stadium in Mainz, Rhineland-Palatinate, Germany, that opened in July 2011. It is used for football matches, and hosts the home matches of the German Bundesliga side Mainz 05.

The stadium has a capacity of 34,034, 19,700 seated, and replaced the Bruchwegstadion. The stadium was originally named Coface Arena after a sponsorship deal with COFACE. From May 2016 to June 2021 the stadium was known as Opel Arena per a naming rights agreement with Opel. 

The stadium adopted its current name in July 2021 following a sponsorship agreement with the MEWA Textil-Service, a German linen rental company.

Opening
To celebrate the opening, FSV Mainz 05 hosted the Ligatotal! Cup 2011, a pre-season tournament with champions Borussia Dortmund, Hamburger SV and Bayern Munich. Borussia Dortmund won the tournament with FSV Mainz 05 finishing last after losing to Bayern Munich in the third-place play-off.

The first league goal scored in the new arena was scored by Tunisian International Sami Allagui for FSV Mainz 05 against Bayer Leverkusen on 7 August 2011.

Gallery

Milestone matches

External links

Official Website (German)
Stadium picture
Facts and data at worldfootball.net(German, English, Spanish)
Atmosphere at Coface-Arena

References

2011 establishments in Germany
Football venues in Germany
1. FSV Mainz 05
Sports venues in Rhineland-Palatinate
Buildings and structures in Mainz
Sports venues completed in 2011